Kirill Koltsov (born February 1, 1983) is a Russian professional ice hockey defenceman. He is currently an unrestricted free agent who most recently played with Avtomobilist Yekaterinburg of the Kontinental Hockey League (KHL). He was selected by the Vancouver Canucks in the 2nd round (49th overall) of the 2002 NHL Entry Draft.

Career statistics

Regular season and playoffs

International

References

External links

1983 births
Living people
Avangard Omsk players
Avtomobilist Yekaterinburg players
Manitoba Moose players
SKA Saint Petersburg players
Salavat Yulaev Ufa players
HC Spartak Moscow players
Torpedo Nizhny Novgorod players
Traktor Chelyabinsk players
Vancouver Canucks draft picks
Russian ice hockey defencemen